Ashford is a village and civil parish in the North Devon district of Devon, England.  According to the 2011 census it had a population of 267.

This Ashford has a different origin to other place-names called Ashford, the origin being "ash-tree enclosure" Old English æsc "ash tree" and worō / worth "enclosure". The name was recorded as Aiscawurde in 1182.

The parish church of St Peter is a grade II* listed building. The tower was rebuilt in 1798 and the remainder in 1854.

References

External links
 
 Devon Local Studies - Ashford community page
 

Villages in Devon